Adriaan Kruisheer (born 7 October 1997) is a Dutch footballer who plays as a midfielder for DVS '33.

He came up through the youth ranks of Almere City, and even captained the under-21 team in the fourth tier. Disillusioned on his chances of breaking into the first team, he made the move to Finnish top-flight side Kemi City in January 2018. He made his professional debut with the team during a Finnish Cup game against MuSa on 11 February, and scored in stoppage time to secure a 2–2 draw. Without playing any league games, though, internal problems in the club led him to abruptly move back to the Netherlands. He spent time with Sparta Nijkerk and signed with DVS '33 in 2020.

Personal life
He lives in Amsterdam and studies business administration at Vrije Universiteit Amsterdam.

References

External links
 
 

Living people
1997 births
Dutch footballers
Footballers from Almere
Association football midfielders
Kemi City F.C. players
Sparta Nijkerk players
DVS '33 players
Derde Divisie players
Dutch expatriate footballers
Dutch expatriate sportspeople in Finland
Expatriate footballers in Finland